Rahm is a given name and surname. Notable people with the name include:

Surname
The surname has a number of etymologies. As a surname of German and Scandinavian origin, it may be a habitational name from a number of places in Westphalia and the Rhineland, or an occupational name derived from Middle High German rām "soot", or an occupational name from  Middle High German rame "stand, rack, frame". The German surname Rähm is a variant of Rehm.

 Bror Yngve Rahm (born 1955), Norwegian politician
 Christina Rahm (c. 1760–1837), Swedish actress and opera singer
 Dave Rahm (1931–1976), Canadian geologist and stunt pilot
 Ilmari Rahm (1888–1938), Finnish chess master
 John Rahm (1854–1935), American golfer 
 Johnny Rahm (1965–2004), American actor
 Jon Rahm (born 1994), Spanish golfer 
 Karl Rahm (1907–1947), Austrian-born German SS officer, commandant of the Theresienstadt concentration camp, executed for war crimes
 Kevin Rahm (born 1971), American actor
 Philippe Rahm (born 1967), Swiss architect

Given name
 Rahm Emanuel (born 1959), American politician, Mayor of Chicago

Fictional characters 
 Rahm Kota, a Jedi who becomes Galen Marek's master in the unfinished Star Wars: The Force Unleashed video game series.

See also 
 Rahme, given name and surname

References

German toponymic surnames
German-language surnames